Acton Bridge railway station serves the nearby village of Acton Bridge, Cheshire, in the northwest of England. It is situated on the West Coast Main Line between Hartford and Warrington, and also sees trains between Liverpool and Birmingham.

History
Acton Bridge opened as Acton by the Grand Junction Railway in 1837, but was renamed Acton Bridge in 1870. After merging into the London and North Western Railway, the company became part of the London, Midland and Scottish Railway during the Grouping of 1923. 

The line then passed on to the London Midland Region of British Railways upon nationalisation in 1948. In addition to its main line calls, the station also served as the terminus of a local service from Crewe via  and  until 1942.

When sectorisation was introduced, the station was served by Regional Railways until the privatisation of British Rail. Trains of the Intercity Sector passed through on express services along the West Coast Main Line.

When British Rail was privatised, Acton Bridge was served by Central Trains until 2007 and then served by London Midland until 2017, before going most recently onto London Northwestern. The latter briefly provided services beyond Birmingham all the way to London Euston until the drop in demand caused by the Covid-19 pandemic meant that this was unviable and so the service was cut once more to Birmingham New Street via Crewe, and Wolverhampton.

Facilities 

Acton Bridge is un-staffed, although tickets can be purchased from a self-service ticket machine, which is connected to the national network, located inside the booking hall. There is no wheelchair access, as all platforms can only be accessed by steps from the footbridge. The station has limited bus connections, and a small car park which can hold around 25 vehicles. Each platform has rudimentary waiting shelters and help points. There is a toilet underneath the road bridge, but it has been closed for many years and is in an unusable condition. 

The station, and its gardens, are maintained by volunteers from Acton Bridge Women's Institute, and won a Commendation in the 2003 JPD 'Best Kept Station' competition.

Services 
Acton Bridge has two trains per hour in weekday peak hours, reducing to one every two hours outside the peaks, all operated by London Northwestern Class 350 trains running between Liverpool Lime Street and Birmingham New Street. These services start later on Sundays and run at reduced timetable. Most trains, particularly northbound, use the centre platforms on the main line, but when a train is delayed or there is disruption, some southbound services towards Birmingham may use the relief line platform instead.

Just south of the station, the line goes from double track to four lines, with two being not only relief lines but also providing connections onto the Chester to Manchester line via Greenbank and Northwich. This link is used primarily by freight, although it could be used as an additional link between Liverpool Lime Street and Manchester Piccadilly.

Trains by Avanti West Coast pass through on services between London, Liverpool and Scotland, but don't stop, although there have been incidents where these trains have paused on the relief line during disruption. It's also been thought that London Northwestern Railway would like to introduce additional services north to Preston, in addition to their route to Liverpool Lime Street, although there's been no solid commitment to this yet. It's additionally something that London Midland initially proposed, but didn't successfully introduce.

References

 
 
 
 Station on navigable O.S. map

External links

Railway stations in Cheshire
Former London and North Western Railway stations
Railway stations in Great Britain opened in 1837
Railway stations served by West Midlands Trains
DfT Category F2 stations
Stations on the West Coast Main Line